Curimatopsis is a genus of small South American fish in the family Curimatidae. They are native to freshwater habitats in the Amazon, Orinoco and Paraguay basins, as well as river of the Guianas.

Species
There are currently 11 recognized species in this genus:

 Curimatopsis cryptica Vari, 1982
 Curimatopsis evelynae Géry, 1964
 Curimatopsis guaporensis Melo & Oliveira, 2017
 Curimatopsis jaci Melo & Oliveira, 2017
 Curimatopsis macrolepis (Steindachner, 1876) 
 Curimatopsis maculosa B. F. Melo, Vari & C. de Oliveira, 2016
Curimatopsis melanura 
 Curimatopsis microlepis C. H. Eigenmann & R. S. Eigenmann, 1889
 Curimatopsis myersi Vari, 1982
 Curimatopsis pallida Melo & Oliveira, 2017
Curimatopsis sabana

References

Curimatidae
Freshwater fish genera
Taxa named by Franz Steindachner